The  is a six-person tag team title established in 2006 by the Japanese professional wrestling promotion . After the promotion folded in 2018, the titles moved to Ganbare☆Pro-Wrestling, a sub-brand of DDT Pro-Wrestling. In June 2021, the title went to Total Triumph Team Pro-Wrestling when Guts Ishijima became a nine-time champion.

Like most professional wrestling championships, the title is won as a result of a scripted match. , there have been thirty reigns shared among fifty-one wrestlers and twenty-seven teams. Jun Masaoka, Kohei Kinoshita and Mataro Aoki are the current champions in their first reign.

Title history

Combined reigns

By team

By wrestler

See also
KO-D 6-Man Tag Team Championship
UWA World Trios Championship

References

External links
Ganbare☆Pro-Wrestling's official website
GWC 6-Man Tag Team Championship history at WrestlingData.com
 GWC 6-Man Tag Team Championship recent history at yu39.net (in Japanese)

DDT Pro-Wrestling championships
Trios wrestling tag team championships